Bigger, Better, Faster, More! is the only studio album released by alternative rock band 4 Non Blondes, released in 1992. The first single was "Dear Mr. President", which bass player Christa Hillhouse told Songfacts "was about the hierarchy of power and government." The second single, "What's Up?", reached No. 1 in several countries and went gold in the United States, while the album itself went platinum, accumulating sales of 1.5 million copies in the United States alone and 6 million copies worldwide.

Track listing

Personnel
4 Non Blondes
 Linda Perry – vocals, acoustic guitar, rhythm guitar, electric guitar
 Christa Hillhouse – bass guitar, vocals
 Dawn Richardson – drums
 Roger Rocha – lead guitar

Additional musicians
 Shaunna Hall – guitar
 Rory Kaplan – Mellotron
 Suzie Katayama – cello, accordion
 Louis Metoyer – guitar
 Dave Rickets – keyboard
 Laurent Tardy – piano

Technical personnel
 David Tickle – producer
 Paul Dieter – engineer
 Mark Hensley – engineer
 Jesse Kanner – engineer
 Kent Matcke – engineer
 Laurent Tardy – engineer
 David Tickle – mixing
 Stephen Marcussen – mastering
 Leslie Gerard-Smith – project coordinator
 Eric Altenburger – design
 Mark Ryden – cover illustration

Charts

Weekly charts

Year-end charts

Certifications and sales

References 

1992 debut albums
4 Non Blondes albums
Interscope Records albums
Albums produced by David Tickle
Albums with cover art by Mark Ryden